An equestrian statue of Paul Revere by Cyrus Edwin Dallin is installed at Paul Revere Mall near the Old North Church in Boston, Massachusetts.

Description and history
The sculpture was modeled in 1885, cast in bronze in 1940, and dedicated on September 22 of that year. The statue rests on a Milford granite base designed by Y. Lovell Little and Raymond A. Porter. The artwork was surveyed by the Smithsonian Institution's "Save Outdoor Sculpture!" program in 1993.

References

External links
 

1940 establishments in Massachusetts
1940 sculptures
Bronze sculptures in Massachusetts
Cultural depictions of Paul Revere
Equestrian statues in Massachusetts
Granite sculptures in Massachusetts
Monuments and memorials in Boston
North End, Boston
Outdoor sculptures in Boston
Sculptures of men in Massachusetts
Statues in Boston
Works by Cyrus Edwin Dallin